Matthew Abood (born 28 June 1986 in Sydney) is a freestyle swimmer from Australia. He won the bronze medal with the Australian swimming team at the 2016 Olympics in Rio de Janeiro as well as the gold medal at the 2011 World Championships in Shanghai.

Abood won the 50m national title in the 2009 Australian Swimming Championships beating the then reigning world record holder Eamon Sullivan. He regained the 50m national title at the 2011 Australian Swimming Championships and won gold in the 4 × 100 m freestyle relay at the World Championships.

In 2013, he won gold at the World Swimming Championships in the Mixed 4x50m freestyle relay category. He placed 5th at the 2013 World Aquatics Championships in the Men's 50m freestyle heats in Spain.

He won gold at the 2014 Pan Pacific Swimming Championships beating the US team led by Michael Phelps and a gold medal at the 2014 Commowealth Games. He also placed 5th at the 2014 World Swimming Championships.

Career best times
According to Swimming Australia, Abood's best times are as follows:

Long course
 50 m Freestyle – 21.74 – 2009 World Championships, Rome
 100 m Freestyle – 48.35 – 2009 World Championships, Rome

Short course
 50 m Freestyle – 20.89 (Australian record holder) – 2009 FINA World Cup, Berlin
 100 m Freestyle – 45.45 (Commonwealth record holder) – 2009 FINA World Cup, Singapore

References

External links
 
 
 
 
 
 
 
 

1986 births
Living people
Australian people of Lebanese descent
Sportspeople of Lebanese descent
Australian male freestyle swimmers
World Aquatics Championships medalists in swimming
Olympic swimmers of Australia
Olympic bronze medalists for Australia
Olympic bronze medalists in swimming
Swimmers at the 2016 Summer Olympics
Medalists at the 2016 Summer Olympics
Commonwealth Games medallists in swimming
Commonwealth Games gold medallists for Australia
Swimmers at the 2014 Commonwealth Games
Swimmers from Sydney
Sportsmen from New South Wales
New South Wales Institute of Sport alumni
Medallists at the 2014 Commonwealth Games